Lite-C is a programming language for multimedia applications and personal computer games, using a syntax subset of the C language with some elements of the C++ language. Its main difference to C is the native implementation of multimedia and computer game related objects like sounds, images, movies, GUI elements, 2D and 3D models, collision detection and rigid body physics. Lite-C executables are compiled instead of interpreted. Lite-C runs on 32-bit and 64-bit Windows XP or Vista operating systems.

Lite-C claims to allow very fast programming with a minimum of code, and easy access to non-programmers. For this, the developer provides a 25-lesson workshop that especially deals with the game and multimedia related objects of the language.

Lite-C supports the Windows API and the Component Object Model (COM); therefore OpenGL and DirectX programs can directly be written in lite-C. It has integrated the free A8 rendering engine.

History
The Lite-C language and compiler was originally developed in 2007 by Conitec in cooperation with Atari, Inc., with the focus on creating computer games by non-programmers. Since 2010, Lite-C is also used for defining automatic trade algorithms in day trading software.

Features
Lite-C has the following differences to standard C:

 Native multitasking and multiplayer support
 On the fly compiling
 Supports external classes (OpenGL, DirectX, Windows API)
 Implementation of the 3D GameStudio A7/A8 rendering engine
 Function library for display/manipulation of 3D models
 Function library for rigid body physics
 Function library for vector and matrix functions
 Function library for GUI objects
 Function library for playing sound and movie files
 Remote control of arbitrary Windows applications
 Native support of DirectX 9 functions
 Small footprint - ca. 15 MB with compiler, IDE, debugger

Lite-C supports rudimentary classes and function overloading, but does not support advanced language concepts such as inheritance, polymorphism, or operator overloading.

Examples
The following Lite-C program prints "Hello World", then plays a movie file and exits.
void main()
{
   printf("Hello, World!"); // message box
   screen_size.x = 400;
   screen_size.y = 400; // resize the window
   int handle = media_play("greetings.mpg",NULL,50); // start a movie in the whole window at volume 50.
   while(media_playing(handle)) wait(1); // wait until movie was finished
   sys_exit(NULL);
}

The following lite-C program opens a 3D window and displays a spinning sphere
void main()
{
   level_load(""); // open an empty level. you can use NULL instead of ""
   ENTITY* sphere = ent_create("sphere.mdl",vector(0,0,0),NULL); // create sphere model at position (0,0,0)
   while(1) {
      sphere->pan += 1; // rotate the sphere with 1 degree per frame
      wait(1);  // wait one frame
   }
}

References

External links
 
  Lite-C download page
 Lite-C user forum

C programming language family